The Sell Out is a 1976 film directed by Peter Collinson that was filmed in Israel. It stars Oliver Reed and Richard Widmark.

Plot
The CIA, the KGB and the Mossad scheme to eliminate Gabriel Lee, a former CIA agent who defected to the Soviet Bloc but left Eastern Europe to travel to Israel. He seeks his old mentor Sam Lucas for help.  Lucas is now running an antiquities store in Jerusalem with his mistress Deborah who was Gabriel's former lover.

Cast
Oliver Reed as Gabriel Lee
Richard Widmark as Sam Lucas
Gayle Hunnicutt as Deborah
Sam Wanamaker as Harry Sickles
Vladek Sheybal as Dutchman

References

External links

1976 films
Italian spy drama films
English-language Italian films
Israeli drama films
English-language Israeli films
British spy drama films
American spy drama films
Films directed by Peter Collinson
Films set in Israel
1976 drama films
1970s spy drama films
Warner Bros. films
1970s English-language films
1970s American films
1970s British films
1970s Italian films